Eugene Francis "Gene" Kranz (born August 17, 1933) is an American aerospace engineer who served as NASA's second Chief Flight Director, directing missions of the Mercury, Gemini and Apollo programs, including the first lunar landing mission, Apollo 11. He directed the successful efforts by the Mission Control team to save the crew of Apollo 13, and was later portrayed in the major motion picture of the same name by actor Ed Harris. He characteristically wore a close-cut flattop hairstyle and the dapper "mission" vests (waistcoats) of different styles and materials made by his wife, Marta Kranz, for his Flight Director missions.

He coined the phrase "tough and competent", which became known as the "Kranz Dictum". Kranz has been the subject of movies, documentary films, and books and periodical articles. Kranz is a recipient of a Presidential Medal of Freedom. In a 2010 Space Foundation survey, Kranz was ranked as the #2 most popular space hero.

Early years
Kranz was born August 17, 1933, in Toledo, Ohio, and attended Central Catholic High School. He grew up on a farm that overlooked the Willys-Overland Jeep production plant. His father, Leo Peter Kranz, was the son of a German immigrant, and served as an Army medic during World War I. His father died in 1940, when Eugene was only seven years old. Kranz has two older sisters, Louise and Helen. 

Kranz was interested in space at a young age; in high school he wrote a thesis on the topic of a single-stage (SSTO) rocket to the Moon. The thesis was titled The Design and Possibilities of the Interplanetary Rocket. Following his high school graduation in 1951, Kranz went to college. He graduated with a Bachelor of Science degree in Aeronautical Engineering from Saint Louis University's Parks College of Engineering, Aviation and Technology in 1954. He received his commission as a second lieutenant in the U.S. Air Force Reserve, completing pilot training at Lackland Air Force Base in Texas in 1955. Shortly after receiving his wings, Kranz married Marta Cadena, a daughter of Mexican immigrants who fled from Mexico during the Mexican Revolution. Kranz was sent to South Korea to fly the F-86 Sabre aircraft for patrol operations around the Korean DMZ.

After finishing his tour in Korea, Kranz left the Air Force and went to work for McDonnell Aircraft Corporation, where he assisted with the research and testing of new Surface-to-Air (SAM) and Air-to-Ground missiles for the U.S. Air Force at its Research Center at Holloman Air Force Base. He was discharged from the Air Force Reserve as a Captain in 1962.

NASA career

After completing the research tests at Holloman Air Force Base, Kranz left McDonnell Aircraft and joined the NASA Space Task Group, then at its Langley Research Center in Virginia. Upon joining NASA, he was assigned, by flight director Christopher C. Kraft, as a Mission Control procedures officer for the uncrewed Mercury-Redstone 1 (MR-1) test (dubbed in Kranz's autobiography as the "Four-Inch Flight", due to its failure to launch).

As Procedures Officer, Kranz was put in charge of integrating Mercury Control with the Launch Control Team at Cape Canaveral, Florida, writing the "Go/NoGo" procedures that allowed missions to continue as planned or be aborted, along with serving as a sort of switchboard operator between the control center at Cape Canaveral and the agency's fourteen tracking stations and two tracking ships (via Teletype) located across the globe. Kranz performed this role for all crewed and uncrewed Mercury flights, including the MR-3 and MA-6 flights, which put the first Americans into space and orbit respectively.

After MA-6, he was promoted to Assistant Flight Director for the MA-7 flight of Scott Carpenter in May 1962. MA-7 was his first mission as assistant flight director (AFD); he was under Kraft (the flight director of MA-7). Kranz and Kraft were not the sole reason that MA-7 was saved, as that would be attributed to the whole efforts of Mission Control, but they played a major role.

Kranz continued in this role for the remaining two Mercury flights and the first three Gemini flights. With the upcoming Gemini flights, he was promoted to the Flight Director level and served his first shift, the so-called "operations shift," for the Gemini 4 mission in 1965, the first U.S. EVA and four-day flight. After Gemini, he served as a Flight Director on odd-numbered Apollo missions, including Apollos 5, 7 and 9, including the first (and only) successful uncrewed test of the Lunar Module (Apollo 5). He was serving as Flight Director for Apollo 11 when the Lunar Module Eagle landed on the Moon on July 20, 1969.

Kranz was chosen to be one of the first flight directors to fly crewed Apollo missions. Kranz worked with the contractor, McDonnell-Douglas on the Mercury and Gemini project, but for Apollo there was a new contractor, Rockwell. Kranz describes Rockwell as new and unfamiliar with the space industry, as they were known for their aeronautical significance at the time.  Kranz was assigned as a division chief for Apollo; his tasks included mission preparation, mission design, the writing of the procedures, and the development of the handbooks. Kranz explains that the Apollo program was different from other programs in that time was a major factor.  Other missions were allotted ample amount of time: Apollo was not given this luxury. The book by NASA, What Made Apollo a Success?, has a section about flight control written by Kranz and James Otis Covington. It gives more detail of the Flight Control Division of the Apollo program.

Kranz explains that the Mission Control logo is an interesting one; he associates it with commitment, teamwork, discipline, morale, tough, competent, risk, and sacrifice.

Apollo 13

Kranz is perhaps best known for his role as lead flight director (nicknamed "White Flight") during NASA's Apollo 13 crewed Moon landing mission. Kranz's team was on duty when part of the Apollo 13 Service Module exploded and they dealt with the initial hours of the unfolding accident. His "White Team", dubbed the "Tiger Team" by the press, set the constraints for the consumption of spacecraft consumables (oxygen, electricity, and water) and controlled the three course-correction burns during the trans-Earth trajectory, as well as the power-up procedures that allowed the astronauts to land safely back on Earth in the command module. He and his team were recommended by NASA Administrator Thomas O. Paine in communications with Richard Nixon to receive the Presidential Medal of Freedom for their roles.

Later career
Kranz continued as a Flight Director through Apollo 17, when he worked his last shift as a flight director overseeing the mission liftoff, and then was promoted to Deputy Director of NASA Mission Operations in 1974, becoming Director in 1983. He was in Mission Control during the January 28, 1986, loss of Space Shuttle Challenger on the STS-51-L launch. He retired from NASA in 1994 after the successful STS-61 flight that repaired the optically flawed Hubble Space Telescope in 1993.

After retirement 
In 2000, Kranz published his autobiography titled Failure Is Not An Option, borrowing from the line used in the 1995 Apollo 13 film by actor Ed Harris. The History Channel later used it to adapt a documentary about Mission Control in 2004.

Starting in 2017, Kranz helped kickstart and direct the restoration of the Mission Control Room in the Johnson Space Center to the appearance and function of its 1969 use during the Apollo 11 mission. The five million dollar project was intended to be completed for the 50th anniversary of the Apollo 11 mission, and for his efforts Kranz was recognized by Houston Mayor Sylvester Turner and October 23, 2018, was declared "Gene Kranz Day". During the 2018 To the Moon and Beyond luncheon hosted by Space Center Houston, The Gene Kranz Scholarship was started, geared towards funding young students to take part in activities and training for careers in STEM. Ohio State Legislature introduced House Bill 358 to designate August 17 "Gene Kranz Day" in fall of 2019. As of June 2020 the bill has passed the state house and awaits the state senate.

Post-retirement Kranz became a flight engineer on a restored Boeing B-17 Flying Fortress, flying at air shows throughout the United States for six years. Kranz continues to give motivational speeches and talks about his experiences with the space programs.

Family
Kranz has six children with his wife, Marta: Carmen (born 1958), Lucy (1959), Joan Frances (1961), Mark (1963), Brigid (1964), and Jean Marie (1966). In a NASA article, Lessons from My Father, Kranz’s youngest daughter Jeannie mentioned that her dad was a very “engaged” father and likened him to the character Ward Cleaver in the television show Leave it to Beaver.

In popular culture

Kranz has appeared as a character in several dramatizations of the Apollo program.  The first portrayal was in the 1974 TV movie Houston, We've Got a Problem, where he is played by Ed Nelson.  He is played by Ed Harris in the 1995 film Apollo 13, who received an Oscar nomination for Best Performance by an Actor in a Supporting Role. Matt Frewer portrays him in the 1996 TV movie Apollo 11.  He is portrayed by Dan Butler in the 1998 HBO miniseries From the Earth to the Moon. In a 2016 episode of the NBC series Timeless titled "Space Race", he is portrayed by John Brotherton. In the 2019 television series For All Mankind he is played by Eric Ladin.

In the videogame Kerbal Space Program, the character for Mission Control is named "Gene Kerman", referencing Kranz and wearing a vest reminiscent of his signature apparel.

Kranz has also been featured in several documentaries using NASA film archives, including the 2004 History Channel production Failure Is Not an Option and its 2005 follow-up Beyond the Moon: Failure Is Not an Option 2, recurring History Channel broadcasts based on the 1979 book The Right Stuff, the 2008 Discovery Channel production When We Left Earth, and the 2017 David Fairhead documentary "Mission Control: The Unsung Heroes of Apollo".

Archive audio clips including Kranz's name and voice are included in the track "Go!" on the 2015 Public Service Broadcasting album, The Race for Space, a track inspired by the Apollo 11 Moon landing.

The Eugene Kranz Junior High School, located in Dickinson, Texas, is named after him.

In 2020, Toledo Express Airport was renamed officially to the Eugene F. Kranz Toledo Express Airport.

"Failure is not an option"
Kranz has become associated with the phrase "failure is not an option." It was uttered by actor Ed Harris, playing Kranz, in the 1995 film Apollo 13. Kranz then used it as the title of his 2000 autobiography. Later it became the title of a 2004 television documentary about NASA, as well as of that documentary's sequel, Beyond the Moon: Failure Is Not an Option 2. Kranz travels all over the world giving a motivational lecture titled "Failure Is Not an Option," including the historic Apollo 13 flight control room.

"Failure is not an option" was in fact coined by Bill Broyles, one of the screenwriters of Apollo 13, based on a similar statement made not by Kranz, but another member of the Apollo 13 mission control crew, FDO Flight Controller Jerry Bostick. According to Bostick:

Teams, "the human factor" and "the right stuff"
Each Flight Director took a different color as a designator; the first three Flight Directors chose red, white, and blue, and each was identified as "_ Flight" (a tradition that continues to this day). Thus, Kranz was White Flight and was the leader of the "White Team", one of the flight control teams whose shift at Mission Control contributed to saving the Apollo 13 astronauts. Though Apollo 13 did not achieve its main objective, to Kranz its astronauts' rescue is an example of the "human factor" born out of the 1960s space race. According to Kranz, this factor is what is largely responsible for helping put the United States on the Moon in only a decade. The blend of young intelligent minds working day in and day out by sheer willpower yielded "the right stuff."

Kranz had this to say about the "human factor":

According to him, a few organized examples of this factor included Grumman, who developed the Apollo Lunar Module, North American Aviation, and the Lockheed Corporation. After the excitement of the 1960s, these companies dissolved in corporate mergers, such as happened when Lockheed became Lockheed Martin. Another example of the "human factor" was the ingenuity and hard work by teams that developed the emergency plans and sequences as new problems arose during the Apollo 13 mission.

"The Kranz Dictum"
Kranz called a meeting of his branch and flight control team on the Monday morning following the Apollo 1 disaster that killed Gus Grissom, Ed White, and Roger Chaffee. Kranz made the following address to the gathering (The Kranz Dictum), in which his expression of values and admonishments for future spaceflight are his legacy to NASA:

After the Space Shuttle Columbia accident in 2003, NASA Administrator Sean O'Keefe quoted this speech in a discussion about what changes should be made in response to the disaster. Referring to the words "tough and competent," he said, "These words are the price of admission to the ranks of NASA and we should adopt it that way."

Views on the space program after the Moon landing

Kranz said that much of the "human factor" dried up after the Moon landings, particularly because the United States viewed the Moon landings as a short-term goal to beat the Soviet Union – and not much more. When asked in spring 2000 if NASA is still the same place today as it was in the years of the space race, he replied:
 

In his book Failure Is Not an Option, he also expressed disappointment that support for space exploration dried up after the Apollo program. Writing about his vision for renewing the space program he said:

Honors
 Toledo Express Airport named after him
 American Institute of Aeronautics and Astronautics: Lawrence Sperry Award, 1967
 Saint Louis University: Alumni Merit Award, 1968; Founders Award, 1993; Honorary Doctor of Science, 2015
 NASA Exceptional Service Medal, 1969 and 1970
 Presidential Medal of Freedom, 1970
 Downtown Jaycees of Washington D.C. Arthur S. Fleming Award – one of ten outstanding young men in government service in 1970
 NASA Distinguished Service Medal, 1970, 1982, and 1988
 NASA Outstanding Leadership Medal, 1973 and 1993
 NASA SES Meritorious Executive, 1980, 1985 and 1992
 American Astronautical Society: AAS Fellow, 1982; Spaceflight Award, 1987
 Robert R. Gilruth Award, 1988, North Galveston County Jaycees
 The National Space Club; Astronautics Engineer of the Year Award, 1992
 Theodore Von Karman Lectureship, 1994
 Recipient of the 1995 History of Aviation Award for the "Safe return of the Apollo 13 Crew," Hawthorne, California
 Honorary Doctor of Engineering Degree from the Milwaukee School of Engineering, 1996
 Louis Bauer Lecturer, Aerospace Medical Association, 2000
 Selected for "2004 and 2006 Gathering of Eagles" honoring Aerospace and Aviation Pioneers at the Air Force Air Command and Staff College, Maxwell AFB, Alabama
 John Glenn Lecture, Smithsonian National Air and Space Museum, 2005
 Lloyd Nolen, Lifetime Achievement in Aviation Award, 2005
 Wright Brothers Lecture – Wright Patterson AFB, 2006
 NASA Ambassador of Exploration, 2006
 Rotary National Award for Space Achievement's National Space Trophy, 2007
 Air Force ROTC Distinguished Alumni Award, 2014
 National Aviation Hall of Fame, 2015
 Honorary Doctorate of Science from Saint Louis University, 2015
 Great American Award, The All-American Boys Chorus, 2015
 Daughters of the American Revolution (DAR) Medal of Honor, 2017
 Vice Admiral Donald D. Engen, U.S. Navy (Ret.), Flight Jacket Night Lecture, Smithsonian National Air and Space Museum – National Air and Space Society, November 8, 2018

References

Sources
 Failure Is Not an Option: Mission Control from Mercury to Apollo 13 and Beyond Gene Kranz, Simon and Schuster, 2000, 
 Lost Moon by James Lovell
 The Last Man on the Moon: Astronaut Eugene Cernan and America's Race in Space by Gene Cernan
 Thirteen: The Apollo Flight That Failed by Henry S. F. Cooper Jr.

External links

 Rotary National Award for Space Achievement (RNASA) | 2007 National Space Trophy Recipient
 Space Lifeguard: An Interview with Gene Kranz from Space.com posted 2000-04-11

 Eugene F. KRANZ long interview conducted by Rebecca Wright et al. of the Johnson Space Center Oral History Project, nasa.gov, January 8, 1999
 "Missing out on outer space" Op-Ed written by Kranz for The Hill. June 12, 2007.
 Smithsonian Magazine article about Gene Kranz's Vest
 

1933 births
Living people
NASA flight controllers
Apollo 13
United States Air Force officers
Presidential Medal of Freedom recipients
Saint Louis University alumni
American people of German descent
People from Toledo, Ohio
NASA people
National Aviation Hall of Fame inductees